Semenko is a gender-neutral Ukrainian surname that may refer to
Andriy Semenko (born 1993), Ukrainian football player 
Dave Semenko (1957–2017), Canadian ice hockey scout, coach and player 
Mel Semenko (born 1937), Canadian football player 
Mykhaylo Semenko (1892–1937), Ukrainian poet

See also
 

Ukrainian-language surnames